Feature may refer to:

Computing 
 Feature (CAD), could be a hole, pocket, or notch
 Feature (computer vision), could be an edge, corner or blob
 Feature (software design) is an intentional distinguishing characteristic of a software item (in performance, portability, or—especially—functionality)
 Feature (machine learning), in statistics: individual measurable properties of the phenomena being observed

Science and analysis
 Feature data, in geographic information systems, comprise information about an entity with a geographic location
 Features, in audio signal processing, an aim to capture specific aspects of audio signals in a numeric way
 Feature (archaeology), any dug, built, or dumped evidence of human activity

Media 
 Feature film, a film with a running time long enough to be considered the principal or sole film to fill a program
 Feature length, the standardized length of such films
 Feature story, a piece of non-fiction writing about news
 Radio documentary (feature), a radio program devoted to covering a particular topic in some depth, usually with a mixture of commentary and sound pictures
 A feature as a guest appearance

Music
Feature (band), a British punk trio.
The Features, an American rock band

Linguistics 
 Feature (linguistics), a property of a class of linguistic items which describes individual members of that class
 Distinctive feature, the most basic unit of structure that can be analyzed by phonetics and phonology

Other uses 
The Feature, a film collaboration between filmmakers Michel Auder and Andrew Neel
The Feature (originally named Give Me Something to Read), a standalone website that features a few high-quality, long-form, nonfiction articles every day from Instapaper's most frequently saved articles

See also

 
 
 Featurette